The American Geosciences Institute (AGI) is a nonprofit federation of about 50 geoscientific and professional organizations that represents geologists, geophysicists, and other earth scientists. The organization was founded in 1948. The name of the organization was changed from the American Geological Institute on October 1, 2011. The organization's offices are in Alexandria, Virginia.

About
AGI's monthly magazine Geotimes became EARTH Magazine on September 1, 2008, with an increased focus on public communication of geoscience research.   As of April 1, 2019, EARTH Magazine suspended publication and has been folded into Nautilus magazine.

Since 1966, AGI has produced GeoRef, a literature database for those studying the earth sciences. AGI operates the Center for Geosciences and Society.

Mission
The stated mission of AGI is to “represent and serve the geoscience community by providing collaborative leadership and information to connect Earth, science, and people.”

See also
List of geoscience organizations

References

External links
Official web page

Geology societies
Earth sciences organizations
Bibliographic database providers
Scientific supraorganizations
Scientific organizations based in the United States
Organizations established in 1948
1948 establishments in the United States
Organizations based in Alexandria, Virginia